Palmeri is a surname derived from the name Palmer.  Notable people with the surname include:

 Frankie Palmeri, member of the band Emmure
 Lori Palmeri (born 1967), American politician
 Martín Palmeri (born 1965), Argentine composer
 Tara Palmeri (born 1987), American journalist

See also
 Palmieri